Oroebantius of Troezena, an ancient epic poet, whose poems were said by the Troezenians to be more ancient than those of Homer.

References
Aelian, V. H. xi. 2.

Early Greek epic poets
Ancient Troezenians